A cleaver is a large knife.

Cleaver or Cleavers may also refer to:

People and fictional characters
 Cleaver (surname), a list of people and fictional characters
 Cleaver Bunton (1902-1999), member of the Australian Senate and mayor

Places
 Cleaver Peak, Grand Teton National Park, Wyoming
 Cleaver Lake (disambiguation), various bodies of water in Canada
 Cleaver House, in Delaware, United States
 Cleaver Square, a garden square in London, United Kingdom

Other uses
 Cleaver (Stone Age tool), a type of stone tool
 Cleaver (geometry), a line segment that bisects the perimeter of a triangle
 Cleaver (propeller), a type of boat propeller design
 Cleaver, a type of arête, that separates a unified flow of glacial ice from its uphill side
 Cleaver (The Sopranos), a metafictional film within a TV series
 Cleavers, a herbaceous plant

See also
Cleave (disambiguation)
Cleavage (disambiguation)